Oxygen concentration may refer to: 
 What oxygen concentrators do - increase the fraction of oxygen in a gas mixture
 Oxygen saturation, the fraction of oxygen dissolved in or carried by a fluid
 Limiting oxygen concentration, the concentration below which combustion can not take place